The Legislature XI of Italy was the 11th legislature of the Italian Republic, and lasted from 23 April 1992 until 14 April 1994. Its composition was the one resulting from the general election of 5 and 6 April 1992. The election was called by President Cossiga on 3 February 1992.

This legislature was one of the shortest in the history of the Italian Republic and is considered the last one of the so-called "First Republic". Characterized by a huge political fragmentation, the legislature prematurely came to an end after many of the historical parties represented in Parliament were overwhelmed by Tangentopoli scandal and subsequently disbanded.

Government

Composition

Chamber of Deputies
 President: Oscar Luigi Scalfaro (DC), elected on 24 April 1992, dismissed on 25 May 1992 (elected President of the Republic), Giorgio Napolitano (PDS), elected on 1 June 1992
 Vice Presidents: Silvano Labriola (PSI), Alfredo Biondi (PLI), Stefano Rodotà (PDS, until 4 June 1992), Mario D'Acquisto (DC, until 17 June 1993), Tarcisio Gitti (DC, from 25 June 1992), Clemente Mastella (DC, from 1 July 1993)

Senate

 President: Giovanni Spadolini (PRI), elected on 24 April 1992
 Vice Presidents: Luciano Lama (PDS), Gino Scevarolli (PSI), Giorgio De Giuseppe (DC), Luigi Granelli (DC)

References

Legislatures of Italy
1992 establishments in Italy
1994 disestablishments in Italy